The Money Habit is a 1924 British silent crime film directed by Walter Niebuhr and starring Clive Brook, Annette Benson and Nina Vanna. It was based on a novel by Paul M. Potter. The screenplay concerns a man whose mistress helps him con a financier into buying a worthless oil well.

Cast
 Clive Brook as Noel Jason  
 Annette Benson as Diana Hastings 
 Nina Vanna as Cecile d'Arcy  
 Warwick Ward as Varian  
 Fred Rains as Marley 
 Eva Westlake as Duchess  
 Philip Hewland as Mr. Hastings  
 Muriel Gregory as Typist 
 Kate Gurney as Mrs. Hastings

References

Bibliography
 Low, Rachael. History of the British Film, 1918-1929. George Allen & Unwin, 1971.

External links

1924 films
1924 crime films
British silent feature films
British crime films
Films based on British novels
British black-and-white films
1920s English-language films
1920s British films